Space for Life is a museum district in Montreal, Quebec, Canada. It brings together the city's four most prominent natural museums: the Montreal Biodome and the Rio Tinto Alcan Planetarium, situated in Montreal's Olympic Park, and the Montreal Botanical Garden and Montreal Insectarium, in the adjacent Maisonneuve Park.

Space for Life was established in 2011 as a successor body to Montreal Nature Museums. It describes itself as the largest natural sciences complex in Canada. As of 2013, its executive director is Charles-Mathieu Brunelle and Montreal executive committee member Manon Gauthier is responsible for its political oversight.

See also
Montreal Science Centre, a science museum in the Old Port

References

External links 
  
  

Neighbourhoods in Montreal
Museum districts
Mercier–Hochelaga-Maisonneuve
Rosemont–La Petite-Patrie